Rørvig is a small town with a population of 1,042 (1 January 2022) in the northern part of the island of Zealand (Sjælland) in eastern Denmark.

Geography 
Rørvig is surrounded by water on three sides: to the north is the Kattegat, to the east is the channel leading into Roskilde Fjord, and to the south is the Isefjord. There is a small fishing industry there, as well as a marina for pleasure craft. The pier is excellent for crabbing (take a peg, a long piece of string and a bucket; the local fish shop usually has old fish heads for bait!). A small distance from Rørvig is a site that is the centre of Denmark. The centre of Denmark is marked with a big stone. At Rørvig harbour, a fishing boat which is a boat that was used during WW2 for dearming mines out at sea. on the boat, you get a fishing rod and worms for fishing flounder and other flat fish, occasionally you can catch a puffer. 

There are several places where you can stay. A popular place to stay is Rørvig senter which is a set of summer houses you can rent. These houses usually have two bedrooms, a kitchen-livingroom-dining room, hall and two bathrooms. Each building is split into two. Recently they have built luxury houses which are bigger and more suitable for families. There is a grill in the centre which can be used by all. There are several shops in the centre of Rørvig including meny (a big food shop) a butcher and some clothing shops.

Rørvig is located a few kilometres from Nykøbing Sjælland. 

The famous Solvognen chariot from the Nordic Bronze Age has been on display at a museum in Rørvig since it was found in the bogs.

Wildlife 
A popular trip is walking from Rørvig to Kattegat since there is a lot of wildlife and plant life on the way. There are many species in Rørvig since there are few cars and people. It is not uncommon to see deer and hares, this is why some people like hunting in these areas. There are also many birds but most of them are common types, like magpies, thrushes, sparrows, blue tits, great tits, blackbirds, Herring gulls, hooded gulls. Of the more rare birds are geese, grouse, and some other types of thrushes. Snails, slugs wasps and just about all other common insects are found in Rørvig.

Ferry 
The Hundested-Rørvig vehicle ferry runs regularly between Rørvig and the small town of Hundested.

Notable people 
 Poul Petersen (1912 in Rørvig – 1959) a Danish swimmer, competed at the 1936 Summer Olympics
 Morten Rutkjær (born 1974 in Rørvig) a Danish former football player and currently the assistant manager of B.93

References

Cities and towns in Region Zealand
Odsherred Municipality